D. J. LeRoy (born February 24, 1957) is a former American football coach. He served as the head football coach at the University of Wisconsin–Stevens Point from 1982 to 1987 and at Coe College from 1989 to 1999. LeRoy's 1987 Wisconsin–Stevens Point team won a share of the NAIA Division II Football National Championship after tying Pacific Lutheran in the title game. When it came to light the following spring that Wisconsin–Stevens Point had used ineligible players that season, the school forfeited its share of the national title and dismissed LeRoy from his position.

A native of Sturgeon Bay, Wisconsin, LeRoy played college football as a running back at the University of Wisconsin–Eau Claire, from which he graduated in 1979. He left Wisconsin–Eau Claire as the program's all-time leading rusher with 2,666 yards. LeRoy signed as a free agent in 1980 with the New York Giants of the National Football League (NFL), but was released before making the team's regular season roster. He earned a master's degree in 1981 from Bemidji State University in Bemidji, Minnesota, where he was a graduate assistant for the football team, working with the linebackers and defensive backs. LeRoy joined the coaching staff at Wisconsin–Stevens Point in 1981 as running backs coach and succeeded Ron Steiner as head coach in 1982.

Head coaching record

Notes

References

1957 births
Living people
Bemidji State Beavers football coaches
Coe Kohawks football coaches
Wisconsin–Eau Claire Blugolds football players
Wisconsin–Stevens Point Pointers football coaches
Bemidji State University alumni
People from Sturgeon Bay, Wisconsin
Players of American football from Wisconsin